Only Human is a documentary shown on Channel 4 in the UK giving an insight into daily lives of people with various disabilities and special needs, as well as various other illnesses such as cancer and weight issues.

Episodes

Series 1 (2005)

Series 2 (2006)

Series 3 (2007)

References
 IMDB Listings for the Show 

2005 British television series debuts
2007 British television series endings
2000s British documentary television series
Channel 4 documentary series
British television documentaries
English-language television shows